Arros is an Aquitanian placename that may refer to:

River
 The Arros (river), one of the main tributaries of the Adour, in the Southwest of France

Places
France
 Arros-de-Nay, a commune of the Pyrénées-Atlantiques department
 Asasp-Arros, a commune of the Pyrénées-Atlantiques department
 Larceveau-Arros-Cibits, a commune of the Pyrénées-Atlantiques department

Spain
 Arròs, village in Vielha e Mijaran, Spain